"Do You Like What You See" is the debut single by German singer Ivy Quainoo who won the first series of The Voice of Germany. It was released as a Digital download in Germany on February 3, 2012 as the lead single from her debut studio album Ivy (2012). The song was written by Sylvia Gordon, Konstantin "Djorkaeff" Scherer, Vincent "Beatzarre" Stein and produced by Marek Pompetzki, Paul NZA, Cecil Remmler.

Track listing

Credits and personnel
 Lead vocals – Ivy Quainoo
 Producers – Marek Pompetzki, Paul NZA, Cecil Remmler
 Lyrics – Sylvia Gordon, Konstantin "Djorkaeff" Scherer, Vincent "Beatzarre" Stein
 Label: Universal Music

Chart performance

Weekly charts

Year-end charts

Release history

References

2012 singles
Ivy Quainoo songs
Universal Music Group singles
2012 songs